Aaron López may refer to:

Aaron Lopez (1731–1782), Anglo-Portuguese Jewish merchant and philanthropist
Aarón Irízar López (born 1950), Mexican politician
Aaron López (footballer) (born 1983)